Men's Football at the 2017 Island Games forms part of the Football at the 2017 Island Games event, and is the fifteenth edition of the Games in which the sport has been played.

Participants

Venues

Group Phase

Group A

Group B

Group C

Group D

Placement play-off matches

15th place match

13th place match

11th place match

9th place match

7th place match

5th place match

Final Stage

Bracket

Semi-finals

Third place match

Final

Final rankings

See also
Women's Football at the 2017 Island Games

External links
Football results

References

Football at the 2017 Island Games
2017